The following is a list of the parks in the city of Toronto, Ontario, Canada. The appearance of Toronto's ravines was altered by floods caused by Hurricane Hazel in October 1954 and many of Toronto's parks were established in the resulting floodplain.

Municipal parks
The following parks are maintained by Toronto Parks, Forestry and Recreation Division:

A

 Abbotsford Park
 Acacia Park
 Academy Soccer Field
 Adams Park
 Adanac Park
 Addington Greenbelt
 Agincourt Park
 Agnes Macphail Square
 Ailsa Craig Parkette
 Alamosa Park
 Alan - Oxford Parkette
 Albert Campbell Square – located at Scarborough Civic Centre
 Albert Crosland Parkette
 Albert Standing Parkette
 Albion Gardens Park
 Alderwood Memorial Park
 Aldwych Park
 Alex Marchetti Park
 Alex Murray Parkette
 Alex Wilson Community Gardens
 Alexander Muir Memorial Gardens
 Alexander Park
 Alexander Street Parkette
 Alexander the Great Parkette
 Alexandra Park
 Alexmuir Park
 Allan Gardens – one of two conservatories in Toronto
 Allan Lamport Stadium and Park
 Allanhurst Park
 Amberdale Ravine
 Ambrose Parkette
 Ames Park
 Amesbury Park
 Amos Waites Park
 Amsterdam Square
 Ancaster Park
 Ancona Park
 Aneta Circle Parkette
 Anewen Greenbelt
 Anniversary Park
 Anson Park
 Anthony Road Public School Park – co-located at Toronto District School Board elementary school
 Antibes Park
 Apted Park
 Arena Gardens – site of the former Mutual Street Arena, the first home of the Toronto Maple Leafs
 Arlington Parkette
 Arsandco Park
 Art Eggleton Park
 Arthur Dyson Parkette
 Ashbridge's Bay Park
 Ashtonbee Reservoir Park – located next to Toronto Water facility
 Asquith Green Park
 Asterfield - Plumrose Blvd Parkette
 Atria Park
 Audrelane Park
 Aura Lee Playing Field (University of Toronto Grounds)
 Austin Terrace Boulevard Lands
 Avalon Parkette
 Avondale Park
 Avonshire Park
 Avonshire Parkette
 Avro Park

B

 Baby Point Club Park
 Bain Avenue Parkette
 Baird Park
 Bakerton Parkette
 Balcarra Park
 Balliol Parkette
 Balmoral Park
 Balmy Beach Park
 Bamburgh Park
 Banbury Park
 Banting Park
 Barbara Hall Park
 Barkdene Park
 Bartlett Parkette
 Bartley Park
 Basswood Parkette
 Bathurst Quay
 Bathurst - Wilson Parkette
 Battery Park
 Baycrest Park
 Bayhampton Parkette
 Bayview - York Mills Parkette
 Bayview Parkette
 Bayview Village Park
 Beach Skatepark
 Beaches Park
 Beaty Avenue Parkette
 Beaty Parkette
 Beaumonde Heights Park
 Beaumont Park
 Beaver - Lightbourn Parkette
 Bedford Parkette
 Beechgrove Park
 Beecroft Park
 Bell Manor Park
 Bellamy Park
 Bellbury Park
 Bellevue Square Park
 Belmar Park
 Belmont Parkette
 Ben Nobleman Park
 Bendale Park
 Benjamin Boake Greenbelt
 Benner Park
 Bennett Park
 Bennington Heights Park
 Berczy Park (named for William Berczy) – located adjacent to Gooderham Building
 Beresford Park
 Berner Trail Park
 Berry Road Park
 Bert Robinson Park
 Bessarion Parkette
 Bestview Park
 Bethune Park (named for Norman Bethune)
 Betty Sutherland Trail Park
 Beverly Glen Park
 Bickford Park
 Bill Hancox Park
 Bill Johnston Park
 Birch Park
 Birchcrest Park
 Birchmount Park and Stadium
 Birchview Boulevard Parkette
 Birkdale Ravine
 Birunthan Park
 Bishop Park
 Bisset Park
 Black Creek Parkland
 Black Creek Site East
 Black Creek Site West
 Blackfriar Park
 Blantyre Park
 Bloor - Bedford Parkette
 Bloor - Parliament Parkette  – formerly Toronto Transit Commission Viaduct Loop
 Bloordale Park North
 Bloordale Park South
 Blue Ridge Park
 Bluehaven Park
 Bluffer's Park
 Blythdale Greenbelt
 Blythwood Ravine Park
 Bob Hunter Park
 Bobbie Rosenfeld Park
 Bond Park
 Bonspiel Park
 Boswell Parkette
 Botany Hill Park
 Boulton Drive Parkette
 Bowan Court Parkette
 Boyington Property
 Bramber Woods Park
 Brandon Avenue Parkette
 Bratty Park
 Breadalbane Park
 Brendwin Circle Parkette
 Briar Crest Park 
 Briar Hill - Chaplin Park
 Briar Hill Parkette
 Bridletowne Park
 Bridlewood Park
 Bright Street Playground 
 Brimley Woods
 Bristol Avenue Parkette 
 Bristol Avenue Parkette West 
 Broadacres Park
 Broadlands Park
 Broadview Subway Station Parkette
 Brookbanks Park
 Brookdale Park
 Brookfield Parkette
 Brooks Road Park
 Brookwell Park
 Browns Line-Lakeshore Parkette
 Bruce Mackey Park
 Brunswick - College Parkette
 Budapest Park
 Budd Sugarman Park
 Burnett Park
 Burnhamill Park
 Burrows Hall Park
 Buttonwood Park
 Byng Park

C

 Cairns Avenue Parkette
 Caledonia Park
 Camborne Parkette
 Campbell Avenue Playground
 Canadian Ukrainian Memorial Park
 Candlebrook Crescent Park
 Canmore Park
 Canoe Landing Park
 Canterbury Place Park
 Capri Park
 Caribou Park – renamed Phil Givens Park in 2016
 Carlton Park
 Cathedral Bluffs Park
 Cedar Brook Park
 Cedarvale Park
 Centennial Park in the former city of Etobicoke
 Centennial Park in the former city of Scarborough
 Central Park
 Centre Park
 Chalkfarm Park
 Charles Brereton Park
 Charles Sauriol Conservation Reserve
 Charlotte Maher Park
 Chartwell Park
 Chatsworth Ravine
 Chelsea Park
 Cherry Beach
 Chorley Park – site of the former fourth Government House
 Christie Pits
 Clanton Park
 Clarence Square
 Clarke Beach Park
 Cliff Lumsdon Park
 Cliffwood Park
 Cloud Gardens (Bay Adelaide Gardens and the Cloud Forest Conservatory)
 Collingwood Park
 Colonel Danforth Park (likely named for road builder Asa Danforth Jr.'s father Asa Danforth
 Colonel Samuel Smith Park
 Colony Park
 Corktown Common
 Coronation Park at foot of Strachan Avenue
 Coronation Park in the former city of Etobicoke
 Coronation Park in the former city of York
 Cotsworth Park
 Coulter Avenue Parkette
 Coxwell Ravine Park
 Cresthaven Park
 Crothers Woods
 Cudia Park
 Cummer Park
 Cy Townsend Park

D

 David A. Balfour Park
 David Crombie Park
 Dell Park
 Delo Park
 Dempsey Park
 Denfield Park
 Dentonia Park
 Dentonia Park Golf Course
 Derrydowns Park
 Dieppe Park
 Dixie Park
 Donald Russell Memorial Park
 Don Mills Trail (a.k.a. Leaside Spur Trail)
 Don Valley Brick Works
 Don Valley Golf Course
 Doris McCarthy Trail 
 Douglas B. Ford Park
 Dovercourt Park
 Downsview Dells Park
 Drumsnab Park
 Dufferin Grove Park
 Dufferin Hill Park
 Duplex Parkette

E

 Earl Bales Park, Barry Zukerman Amphitheatre and North York Ski Centre
 Earlscourt Park
 East Don Parklands
 East Lynn Park
 East Point Park
 Eastview Park
 Ed & Anne Mirvish Parkette
 Edwards Gardens 
 Eglinton Flats
 Eglinton Park
 Elijah Park (formerly Rajah Park)
 Elizabeth Simcoe Park
 Empringham Park
 Esther Lorrie Park
 Étienne Brûlé Park
 Etobicoke Valley Park
 E.T. Seton Park

F

 Fairbank Memorial Park
 Farquarson Park
 Fergy Brown Park
 Finch Parkette
 Flemington Park
 Forestry Island Park – on Toronto Islands
 Fountainhead Park
 Frank Stollery Parkette
 Fraserwood Park
 Fundy Bay Park

G

 Garnier Park
 Garrison Creek Park
 Garthdale Park
 George Faludy Park
 Giltspur Park
 Glen Agar Park
 Glen Cedar Park
 Glen Long Park
 Glen Rouge Park and Campgrounds (adjacent to Bead Hill site)
 Glen Stewart Park
 Glen Stewart Ravine
 Glendora Park
 Glenn Gould Park
 Goldhawk Park
 G. Ross Lord Park
 Grandravine Park
 Grange Park
 Greenwood Park
 Grey Abbey Trail and Ravine
 Guild Park and Gardens
 Gwendolyn MacEwen Park

H

 Habitant Park
 Healey Willan Park
 Heart Park – formerly Otter Loop
 Heathrow Park
 Hendon Park
 High Park
 Highland Creek
 Highview Park and Roy Halladay Field
 Hillcrest Park
 Hillmount Parkette
 Hillside Park
 Holley Park
 Home Smith Park
 Howard Talbot Park
 HTO Park
 Hullmar Park
 Humber Arboretum
 Humber Bay Park
 Humberline Park
 Humber Marshes
 Humber Valley Golf Course
 Humewood Park
 Huntsmill Park
 Hupfield Park

I–K

 Ireland Park
 Iroqouis Park
 Island Park – on Toronto Islands
 Ivan Forrest Gardens
 Jack Goodland Park
 James Gardens
 Jane Osler Park
 Jean Sibelius Square
 Jeff Healey Park
 Jesse Ketchum Park
 Jimmie Simpson Park
 John Tabor Park
 JT Watson Park
 June Callwood Park
 June Rowlands Park (formerly Davisville Park) and Sharon, Lois & Bram Playground
 Kay Gardner Beltline Park
 Keelesdale Park
 Kempton Howard Park
 Kew Gardens Park
 King's Mill Park

L

 Lambton Woods
 Lake Shore Boulevard Parklands
 L'Amoreaux Park and Cricket Grounds
 Laughlin Park
 Laura Park
 Lawren Harris Square
 Lawrence Park
 Leaside Park
 Lescon Park
 Leslie Park
 Lillian Park
 Lindylou Park
 Linus Park
 Lissom Park
 Lithuania Park
 Little Norway Park
 Littles Road Park
 Loring-Wyle Parkette
 Lower Don Parklands
 Lower Highland Creek Park
 Lytton Park

M

 McAllister Park
 McCleary Park
 McCormick Park
 McCowan District Park
 McDairnud Woods Park
 McLevin Park
 McNicoll Park
 Magwood Park
 Mallaby Park
 Malta Park
 Maple Leaf Forever Park
 Maple Leaf Park
 Marie Curtis Park
 Marilyn Bell Park
 Market Lane Park
 Martin Goodman Trail
 Maurice J. Breen Park
 Maryvale Park
 Matt Cohen Park
 Megan Park
 Milliken Park
 Millwood Park
 Mission Ground Parkette
 Mitchell Field Park
 Monarch Park
 Mondeo Park
 Montclaire Avenue Parkette
 Moore Park Ravine
 Moorevale Park
 Morningside Park
 Morningview Trail Ravine
 Moss Park
 Muirlands Park

N–O

 Natal Park
 Neilson Park
 Newtonbrook Park
 Nicol MacNicol Parkette
 North Park
 North Kipling Park
 Northend Parkette
 Northwood Park
 Oak Street Park
 Olive Square Park
 Olympia Park
 Olympic Island Park
 Orchard Park
 Ordnance Triangle Park
 Oriole Park
 Orphan's Green
 Owen Park

P–R

 Palace Pier Park
 Palmerston Gardens
 Pantry Park
 Park Drive Reservation Land
 Park Lawn Park
 Phil Givens Park — formerly Caribou Park
 Pinetree Park
 Pinto Park
 Pine Point Park
 Port Royal Park
 Prince Edward Viaduct Parkette
 Prince of Wales Park
 Princess Margaret Park
 Queen's Greenbelt (not to be confused with Queen's Park in downtown Toronto)
 Ramsden Park
 Raymore Park
 Regent Park North
 Rekai Family Parkette
 Rennie Park
 Ricardo Parkette
 Riverdale Park
 Roding Park
 Rosebank Park
 Rosedale Field
 Rosedale Valley Lands
 Rosetta McLain Gardens
 Roycroft Park
 Rouge Beach Park
 Rouge Park East
 Roundhouse Park
 Rowntree Mills Park
 Runnymede Park

S

 St. Andrew's Market and Playground
 St. James Park
 St. Lucia Park
 Scarborough Heights Park
 Scarlett Mills Park
 Scarlett Woods Golf Course
 Sculpture Gardens
 Seaton Park
 Seneca Hill Park
 Sentinel Park
 Serena Gundy Park
 Sergeant Ryan Russell Parkette — formerly Dupont Parkette 
 Shawnee Park
 Sherbourne Common
 Sherwood Park
 Sheppard East Park
 Skymark Park
 Silvercreek Park
 Silverview Park
 Sir Casimir Gzowski Park
 Sir Winston Churchill Park
 Smythe Park
 Snake Island Park – on Toronto Islands
 Snider Parkette
 Snowhill Park
 Sonya's Park
 South Humber Park
 South Marine Drive Park
 Suydam Park
 Stan Wadlow Park
 Stanley Park
 Stanley Park North
 Stanley Park South
 Stratford Park
 Sugar Beach
 Sumach-Shuter Parkette
 Summerlea Park
 Sunnybrook Park (and Sunnybrook Stables)
 Sunnyside Park
 Sun Row Park
 Sylvan Park and Gates Gully

T–V

 Taddle Creek Park
 Talwood Park
 Tam O'Shanter Golf Course
 Taylor Creek Park
 Terry Fox Park
 Thistletown Area
 Thomson Memorial Park
 Thomson Riley Park
 Tip Top Park
 Todmorden Mills Park
 Tommy Thompson Park
 Toronto Botanical Garden in Edwards Gardens
 Toronto Music Garden
 Toronto Islands
 Toronto Track and Field Centre
 Town Hall Square
 Trace Mane Park
 Trinity Bellwoods Park and SkyDome baseball diamond (named after the former name of the Rogers Centre multi-purpose stadium)
 Trinity Square and Labyrinth Park
 Underpass Park
 Vale of Avoca
 Valleyfield Park
 Varna Park
 Viewmount Park

W–Z

 Wallace-Emerson Park
 Walter Saunders Memorial Park
 Wanless Park
 Washington Street Parkette
 Waterfront Park
 Warden Woods Park
 Wedgewood Park
 Wellington Cat Promenade
 Wells Hill Park
 Wellsworth Park
 Wellesley Park
 Wenderley Park
 West Don Park
 West Humber Parkland
 Weston Lions Park
 West Rouge Park
 Westlake Memorial Park — formerly Jasper Park
 Westview Greenbelt
 White Haven Park
 Wickson Trail Park
 Wilket Creek Park
 Willesden Park
 Willowdale Park
 Wilmington Park
 Windfields Park
 Withrow Park
 Winchester Park
 Wishing Well Park
 Wonscotonach Parklands — formerly Don River Valley Park
 Woodbine Park — formerly Greenwood Raceway
 Woodbine Beach Park
 Wychwood Barns Park — former Toronto Transit Commission streetcar barn 1913–1992
 York Beltline Trail
 York Mills Valley Park
 York Stadium
 York Street Park
 Yorkdale Park
 Yorkminister Park
 Yorkminster Park Baptist Church Park
 Yorkville Park
 Zooview Park

Provincial parks

There are three provincially owned parks in the City of Toronto.

Parks that are owned by the Government of Ontario include:

 Ontario Place — artificially constructed former amusement park and entertainment and event facility on the waterfront south of Exhibition Place and is being considered for redevelopment
 Queen's Park — park setting on the south and north ends of the Ontario Legislative Building. The southern portion of the park is owned by the provincial government, while the northern portion of the park is owned by the University of Toronto and leased to the municipal government for 999 years; not to be confused with Queen's Greenbelt in North York
 Trillium Park — artificially constructed park with a natural-looking landscape planted with native tree and shrub species; built on the site of a former Ontario Place parking lot

Federal parks

There are three federally owned parks in the City of Toronto, including one national park managed by Parks Canada, a federal agency of the Government of Canada.

Parks owned by the federal government include:

 Downsview Park — converted military base CFB Downsview/Downsview Airport in North York
 Harbourfront Park — waterfront promenade and urban park amongst residential and commercial development along Queens Quay
 Rouge National Urban Park — a national urban park and nature preserve centred around the Rouge Valley with some agricultural uses

Toronto and Region Conservation Authority
The Toronto and Region Conservation Authority (TRCA) (an agency of the provincial government) is one of 36 conservation authorities in Ontario, Canada with a jurisdiction covering  over nine different watersheds. The TRCA operates a number of conservation areas in the Toronto region, including three within the City of Toronto limits:
 Black Creek Pioneer Village primarily in North York
 Tommy Thompson Park (Leslie Street Spit) on the Toronto waterfront
 Humber Bay Shores Waterfront Park — a park linking City-owned Palace Pier Park and Humber Bay Park East on the south side of Marine Parade Drive to Park Lawn Road in Etobicoke.

TRCA briefly managed part of Rouge Park before it was transferred to Parks Canada.

See also

Fauna of Toronto
Native trees in Toronto
Toronto ravine system
List of Toronto recreation centres
Toronto Zoo, paid year-round attraction in the Rouge Valley owned by the City of Toronto and operated by a board of management

Notes

References

External links

Toronto Parks & Recreation website
Official Toronto Parks listing
Centre Island Amusement Park
High Park Community Advisory Council
Toronto Parks Photo Gallery

 
Toronto
Parks
Toronto